John William Milton (November 11, 1898 – May 16, 1949) was an American football player who played professionally in the National Football League (NFL). He split the 1923 NFL season between the Milwaukee Badgers and the St. Louis All-Stars before playing the following season with the Kansas City Blues.

References

1898 births
1949 deaths
American football ends
Kansas City Blues (NFL) players
Milwaukee Badgers players
St. Louis All-Stars players
USC Trojans football players
Players of American football from Kansas